SVFC can refer to one of the following Scottish association football clubs:

 Saltcoats Victoria F.C.
 Steelend Victoria F.C.
 Stonehouse Violet F.C.